Meringandan West is a rural locality in the Toowoomba Region, Queensland, Australia.

Geography
Meringandan West is on Darling Downs in southern Queensland.

The majority of the eastern boundary is aligned with Meringandan Creek

Central parts of the area have been developed into a residential estate. Meringandan West was part of a local planning scheme developed and adopted by the Toowoomba Region Council in August 2013.

Meringandan cemetery is located in Peters Road.

History 
The name Meringandan is taken from the former railway station, which in turn is  a Gooneburra word meaning red soil or broken clay.

Meringandan State School opened on 24 January 1876. It was built during 1875 by Jack Maag. Isaac John Thomas was appointed the first head teacher of the school,. The enrolment for that year was 80 pupils. It is now within the suburb boundaries of Meringandan West.

Meringandan West was separated from Meringandan by Meringandan Creek (which also formed the boundary between the Shire of Crows Nest and the Shire of Rosalie) with Meringandan West falling under the jurisdiction of the Shire of Rosalie. in 2008, both Meringandan and Meringandan West both came under the jurisdiction of the newly created Toowoomba Region.

Facilities
There are several scattered parks. The most notable park is Lilyvale Oval, which has an unlit sporting field (cricket pitch), which is used for a radio-controlled model aircraft flying field on occasion by the local inhabitants and visitors also, probably, operates as a flood basic, a playground, a picnic table, and a community shed, as well as a BBQ and toilet block for public use.

Next to this park, is a shed, from which operates the local rural fire brigade.

Lilyvale Oval, was once used for an annual rodeo hosted by the P&C of Meringandan State School. The P&C also used to run Christmas Carols in the park, but they were also cancelled for lack of funding. Small church groups still used the park for annual carols nights.

In the east of Meringandan West, there is a small cemetery.

Education 
Meringandan State School is a government primary (Prep-6) school for boys and girls at 10 School Road. In 2017, the school had an enrolment of 240 students with 20 teachers (15 full-time equivalent) and 14 non-teaching staff (8 full-time equivalent).

References

Toowoomba Region
Localities in Queensland